Sir Malcolm Smith (1 December 1856 – 12 March 1935) was a Scottish Liberal Party politician.

Life

Smith was born and brought up in a crofting family in Hoswick Shetland but moved to the port of Leith as a young man.  There he prospered as a businessman and became the Provost of Leith from 1908 to 1917, shortly before the town was incorporated into the city of Edinburgh. During this period he lived at 47 Stirling Road in the Trinity district.

He was elected unopposed as the Member of Parliament (MP) for the island constituency of Orkney and Shetland in a by-election in May 1921, following the death of the sitting MP, Cathcart Wason. Having stood in the by-election as a Coalition Liberal, supporting the coalition government led by David Lloyd George, he stood at the 1922 general election as a National Liberal, but was defeated by the Liberal party candidate Robert William Hamilton.

He died in Leith and was buried in Warriston Cemetery to the south-east of the vaults.

A memorial to Smith and his wife also exists in the south aisle of South Leith Parish Church.

Family

He was married to Jane Tod Dickson (1860–1944).

References 

1856 births
1935 deaths
Members of the Parliament of the United Kingdom for Orkney and Shetland
Scottish Liberal Party MPs
UK MPs 1918–1922
Place of birth missing
People from Shetland
National Liberal Party (UK, 1922) politicians